Josep Renau Berenguer (17 May 1907 — 11 November 1982) was an artist and communist revolutionary, notable for his propaganda work during the Spanish Civil War. Among his production, he is remarkable for his art deco period, his political propaganda during the Spanish Civil War, the photomurals of the Spanish Pavilion in the International Exhibition of 1937 in Paris, a series of photomontages titled Fata Morgana or The American Way of Life, and murals and paintings made in Mexico, such as Tropic, dated in 1945.

1907 births
1982 deaths
Spanish artists
Spanish emigrants to East Germany
Exiles of the Spanish Civil War